"Dontchange" is the second and last single from Musiq Soulchild's second album Juslisen. It was released on October 29, 2002, as a 12" single, after being serviced to radios in July 2002.

It debuted on the Billboard Hot R&B/Hip-Hop Songs chart on August 10, 2002, spending 42 weeks on the chart and reaching a peak position at number 3. On the Billboard Hot 100, it debuted on September 7, 2002, spending 26 weeks there and peaking at #17. The song hit # 1 on the Adult R&B chart and stayed there for 9 weeks from November 9, 2002 to February 7, 2003.

Charts

Weekly charts

Year-end charts

References

Musiq Soulchild songs
2002 singles
2002 songs
Songs written by Ivan Barias
Songs written by Carvin Haggins
Songs written by Frank Romano
Songs written by Musiq Soulchild
Contemporary R&B ballads